Gran is a village in Gran Municipality in Innlandet county, Norway.

Gran and its neighboring village of Ringstad have grown together through conurbation and Statistics Norway has considered them as one, single urban settlement for many years.

The Norwegian National Road 4 and the Gjøvikbanen railway line both run through the village. Ål Church is located in the village.

References

Gran, Norway
Villages in Innlandet